3-Hydroxyisobutyric acid (or 3-hydroxy-2-methylpropanoic acid) is an intermediate in the metabolism of valine. It is a chiral compound having two enantiomers, D-3-hydroxyisobutyric acid and L-3-hydroxyisobutyric acid.

See also 
2-hydroxybutyric acid
3-hydroxyisobutyrate dehydrogenase

References

Beta hydroxy acids